Dr. Jekyll and Mr. Hyde is a 1988 side-scrolling action video game for the Nintendo Entertainment System loosely based on the 1886 novella Strange Case of Dr Jekyll and Mr Hyde by Robert Louis Stevenson. Gameplay alternates between the characters of Dr. Jekyll and Mr. Hyde based on the player's ability to either avoid or cause damage.

Gameplay and premise

The story of the game is based on Robert Louis Stevenson's novel, with Dr. Jekyll on the way to his forthcoming wedding to Miss Millicent. The game's ending depends on which character, Jekyll or Hyde, reaches the church first.

As Dr. Jekyll walks to the church with his cane in hand, several townspeople, animals, and other obstacles obstruct his path, causing him to become angry. After his stress meter fills up, Dr. Jekyll will transform into Mr. Hyde. The gameplay then moves to a demonic world, where Hyde will fire out a "psycho wave" at enemies. The Psycho Wave is in fact proudly displayed on the game's cover.  As Mr. Hyde kills these monsters, his anger abates and eventually he transforms back into Dr. Jekyll.

The game features six levels, but the levels differ between the Japanese and North American versions. The Japanese version follows this order: City, Park, Alley, Town, Cemetery, Street. However, the North American version replaces a few levels and follows this order: Town, Cemetery, Town, Park, Cemetery, Street. The North American version also removed certain sprites and segments from the original Japanese version.

The player starts out controlling Dr. Jekyll on his way to the church, walking to the right. Contrary to most platformers, Dr. Jekyll cannot kill the majority of his enemies (though he is equipped with a cane,) and as a result, must avoid his enemies rather than confront them directly. As he takes damage from the various enemies and obstacles, his Life Meter decreases and his Anger Meter increases. If his Life Meter is fully depleted, Dr. Jekyll dies and the game is over. If his Anger Meter completely fills, however, he transforms into Mr. Hyde. Day turns to night and monsters appear. At this point, the level is mirrored horizontally and Mr. Hyde walks from right to left with the screen autoscrolling. Mr. Hyde must kill monsters as fast as he can in order to turn back into Dr. Jekyll, with Shepp monsters generally giving the largest refill to his Meter, though killing other monsters may refill the Meter a small amount. Once the player returns as Dr. Jekyll, 70% of his Life Meter is restored.

If Hyde reaches a spot equivalent to where Dr. Jekyll reached in the latter's world (except in the final segment), a bolt of lightning strikes and kills him instantly. Therefore, the objective of the game is to advance as far as possible as Dr. Jekyll and to transform back as soon as possible as Mr. Hyde. However, the more detailed alternative ending of the game requires the player to strategically reach the Church with Mr. Hyde but make sure Dr Jekyll stays ahead of Mr. Hyde until the final level.

Reception

While initial reviews upon release were mixed, reception became more negative as years progressed, with reviewers citing bad graphics, confusing gameplay, and poor use of the characters and setting.  Darrell Monti of Nintendo Life called it one of the worst games he got for the NES. In 2004, Game Informer reviewed the game in their Retro Reviews section and gave it a 5 out of 100, ending the review by saying "Flawed on every fundamental level, Dr. Jekyll and Mr. Hyde is possibly the most unplayable garbage available on the NES." In 2018, Eurogamer placed the game as number 8 on their list of top ten worst games of the 80s. The writers complained that nothing is explained to the player, and that some characters harm the player, but some do not. They called it a frustrating and confusing experience. IGN ranked the cover art the third scariest cover art in gaming.

See also
 List of video games notable for negative reception

References
Notes

Footnotes

1988 video games
Bandai games
Nintendo Entertainment System games
Nintendo Entertainment System-only games
Video games set in England
Video games set in the 19th century
Video games based on Strange Case of Dr Jekyll and Mr Hyde
Video games developed in Japan
Single-player video games
Video games about mental health
Video games about shapeshifting
Video games with alternate endings
Side-scrolling video games